Irakli Mirtskhulava is a Georgian rugby union player who plays as a prop for Oyonnax in the Top 14.

Notes

1984 births
Living people
Rugby union players from Georgia (country)
Georgia international rugby union players
Rugby union props